The 1995 Kerry Senior Football Championship was the 95th staging of the Kerry Senior Football Championship since its establishment by the Kerry County Board in 1889. The championship ran from 10 June to 8 October 1995.

Austin Stacks entered the championship as the defending champions, however, they were beaten by Spa-Gneeveguilla in the second round.

The final was played on 8 October 1995 at Austin Stack Park in Tralee, between Laune Rangers and East Kerry, in what was their first ever meeting in the final. Laune Rangers won the match by 1-07 to 0-06 to claim their ninth championship title overall and a first title in two years.

East Kerry's Paud O'Donoghue was the championship's top scorer with 0-20.

Results

Round 1

Round 2

Quarter-finals

Semi-finals

Final

Championship statistics

Top scorers

Overall

In a single game

References

Kerry Senior Football Championship
1995 in Gaelic football